Marlborough Lines is a British Army installation on the former site of RAF Andover in Hampshire, England.

History
Marlborough Lines was built on part of a former airfield on the western outskirts of the town of Andover, RAF Andover, which had been established in 1917 and closed in 2009. In 2011 Army Headquarters, which started to take responsibility for more than 2,000 military and civilian personnel, was established at Marlborough Lines.

References

Installations of the British Army
Andover, Hampshire
Military in Hampshire